The Bamboccianti were genre painters active in Rome from about 1625 until the end of the seventeenth century. Most were Dutch and Flemish artists who brought existing traditions of depicting peasant subjects from sixteenth-century Netherlandish art with them to Italy, and generally created small cabinet paintings or etchings of the everyday life of the lower classes in Rome and its countryside.

Typical subjects include food and beverage sellers, farmers and milkmaids at work, soldiers at rest and play, and beggars, or, as Salvator Rosa lamented in the mid-seventeenth century, "rogues, cheats, pickpockets, bands of drunks and gluttons, scabby tobacconists, barbers, and other 'sordid' subjects." Despite their lowly subject matter, the works found appreciation among elite collectors and fetched high prices.

Artists

Many of the artists associated with the Bamboccianti were members of the Bentvueghels (Dutch for 'birds of a feather'), an informal association of mainly Dutch and Flemish artists in Rome.  It was customary for the Bentvueghels to adopt an appealing nickname, the so-called 'bent name'.  The bent name of the Dutch painter Pieter van Laer was "Il Bamboccio", which means "ugly doll" or "puppet".  This was an allusion to van Laer's ungainly proportions. Van Laer is regarded as the initiator of the Bamboccianti style of genre painting and his nickname gave the genre and the group of artists its collective name.  He became the inspiration and focal point around which likeminded artists congregated during his stay in Italy (1625–1639).

The initial Bamboccianti included Andries and Jan Both, Karel Dujardin, Jan Miel, Johannes Lingelbach and the Italian Michelangelo Cerquozzi.  Sébastien Bourdon was also associated with this group during his early career. Other Bamboccianti include Michiel Sweerts, Thomas Wijck, Dirck Helmbreker, Jan Asselyn, Anton Goubau, Willem Reuter, and Jacob van Staverden.

The Bamboccianti influenced Rococo artists such as Domenico Olivieri, Antonio Cifrondi, Pietro Longhi, Giuseppe Maria Crespi, Giacomo Ceruti, and Alessandro Magnasco. Their paintings of everyday Roman life continued into the nineteenth century through the works of Bartolomeo and Achille Pinelli, Andrea Locatelli and Paolo Monaldi. A Bambocciante not yet identified painted also an Assalto d'armati (armed assault), now in the Forlì "Pinacoteca Civica" (City Art Gallery).

Characteristics
Giovanni Battista Passeri, a seventeenth-century chronicler of art, described van Laer's work as an "open window" that provides an accurate representation of the world around him, characteristics applied to the Bamboccianti in general:
"era singular nel represetar la veritá schietta, e pura nell'esser suo, che li suoi quadri parevano una finestra aperta pe le quale fussero veduti quelli suoi successi; senza alcun divario, et alterazione."

"[he] was unique in representing the truth, in its pure essence, such that his paintings appear to us like an open window through which we can see all that happens, without difference or alteration"

Passeri expressed here the traditional art historical view that the Bamboccianti paintings offered a realist "true portrait of Rome and its popular life" "without variation or alteration" of what the artist sees. However, their contemporaries did not generally regard the Bamboccianti as realists.  An alternative view of the art of the Bamboccianti is that their works should rather be seen as complex allegories which are a commentary on classical art with a view to bringing the observer to contemplate elevated ideas. They thus stand in a long tradition of paradox in which low or vulgar subjects were the vehicle for conveying important philosophical meanings.  For instance, the Bamboccianti regularly made paintings of gigantic limekilns outside Rome.  These limekilns used the marble and travertine blocks of the Roman antique ruins as raw material and thus played a direct role in the destruction of Rome's ancient monuments.  The limekilns themselves are painted in a grandiose way as if they were the new monuments of Rome.  The kilns created something new from the ruins of ancient Rome and the lime they produced was used in the construction of new monuments in Rome.  The paintings of these limekilns can therefore be read as a reflection on the transience of glory as well as the regenerative power of Rome.  In other words, these paintings were intended to be read ironically and allegorically (even as paradoxes) and not as exact, realist depictions of life in Rome.

During the 1640s and 1650s Jan Miel and Michelangelo Cerquozzi started to expand the scope of Bamboccianti compositions by paying more attention to the surrounding landscape and emphasising less the anecdotal aspects of city and country life. These works were repeatedly used as a model by the Bamboccianti from the second half of the century and by the genre painters working in Rome during the early 18th century. Miel's most original contribution to this genre are his carnival scenes.

The painter Karel Dujardin brought a different variation to the genre by placing his genre paintings of peasants and charlatans in the idealized setting of the lofty ruins in the countryside around Rome.

Critical reception

Although the Bamboccianti found success with their paintings, art theorists and academicians in Rome were often unkind as paintings of everyday life were generally regarded as being at the bottom rung in the hierarchy of genres.  The artists themselves were often admired: van Laer was known as an artist whose works could command a high price and Michelangelo Cerquozzi was able to gain access to aristocratic circles and befriend artists such as Pietro da Cortona.

Among the collectors and patrons of the Bamboccianti one finds Cardinal del Monte, Vincenzo Giustiniani, papal families such as the Barberini and Pamphili and female patrons including elite Roman aristocrats and Christina, Queen of Sweden. The success of the genre was not confined to Rome, but extended to Florence and France, as seen in the patronage of figures like the Cardinals Leopoldo de' Medici and Mazarin.

The success of the genre is partly explained by a change in the mode of decorating the houses of the upper classes in Rome. Paintings on canvas or panel gradually gained preference over frescoes. This gave foreign artists who were specialized in this technique an advantage. Furthermore, as art lovers were looking for new topics there existed a favorable environment for the reception of Bamboccianti art.

The fact that learned and aristocratic patrons continued to purchase works by these artists was frequently bemoaned by painters of histories and other genres within the accepted canon of the city's main artistic establishment, the Academy of St. Luke. For example, Salvator Rosa, in his satire on painting Pittura (c. 1650), complains bitterly about the taste of the aristocratic patrons and their acceptance of such everyday subjects:
"Quel che aboriscon vivo, aman dipinto."
"Those they abhor in life, are loved in paint"

As is reflected in Rosa's comment, such derision was usually directed not at the artists but towards those who bought the works.   Acceptance of the Bamboccianti in the Accademia di San Luca, the prestigious association of leading artists in Rome was not impossible, however. This is demonstrated by the fact that van Laer and Cerquozzi were associated with both (van Laer was also a member of the Bentvueghels).  Jan Miel was in 1648 even the first northern artist to be admitted to the Accademia di San Luca.

See also
 Romanism (painting)

Sources

 
 Brigstocke, Hugh. "Bourdon, Sébastien", Grove Art Online. Oxford University Press, [October 30, 2007].

Notes

External links

Flemish Baroque painters
Flemish genre painters
Art movements in Dutch painting
Art of the Dutch Golden Age

Bamboccianti
Bamboccianti
17th century in Rome